Pavel Dreksa (born 17 September 1989 in Prostějov) is a Czech football defender who plays for FC Zbrojovka Brno. He made his first team debut for Sigma Olomouc in 2009. In 2017 he left the Czech Republic on loan to Neftçi PFK in Azerbaijan. His father-in-law is former Czech defender Petr Maléř.

He also played for Czech youth national teams.

Honours 
SK Sigma Olomouc
 Czech Cup: 2011–12

References

External links
 Interview for vFotbal.cz 30.12.2010
 
 

1989 births
Living people
Sportspeople from Prostějov
Czech footballers
Czech expatriate footballers
Czech Republic youth international footballers
Czech Republic under-21 international footballers
Czech National Football League players
Czech First League players
Azerbaijan Premier League players
SK Sigma Olomouc players
FC Zbrojovka Brno players
FC Baník Ostrava players
FK Ústí nad Labem players
1. SC Znojmo players
MFK Karviná players
Neftçi PFK players
Czech expatriate sportspeople in Azerbaijan
Expatriate footballers in Azerbaijan

Association football defenders